The La Amarga Formation is a geologic formation with outcrops in the Argentine provinces of Río Negro, Neuquén, and Mendoza. It is the oldest Cretaceous terrestrial formation in the Neuquén Basin.

The type locality is La Amarga Arroyo and China Muerta Hill. The La Amarga Formation unconformably overlies the marine Agrio Formation of the Mendoza Group. It is in turn overlain by the Lohan Cura Formation, separated by another unconformity.

Composition 
There are three members within the La Amarga Formation.
Paleosols, or soil deposits, are well-developed.
Alternating limestones, shales, and siltstones make up this member, indicating a lacustrine (lake) environment.
This member consists of alternating sandstones and siltstones from an ancient alluvial plain, with some swamp and paleosol deposits.

Fossil content 
Most of the tetrapod fossils found in the La Amarga come from the Puesto Antigual Member, including:

a crocodilian (Amargasuchus)
dicraeosaurid sauropods (Amargasaurus, Amargatitanis)
a diplodocoid sauropod (Zapalasaurus)
a titanosaurian sauropod
an abelisauroid theropod (Ligabueino)
a stegosaur (Amargastegos)
a mammal (Vincelestes)

Dinosaurs

Other tetrapods

See also 
 List of dinosaur-bearing rock formations

References

Bibliography

Further reading 
 
 

 
Geologic formations of Argentina
Lower Cretaceous Series of South America
Cretaceous Argentina
Sandstone formations
Mudstone formations
Alluvial deposits
Fluvial deposits
Lacustrine deposits
Paleontology in Argentina